Mosrentgen, known officially as Posolok zavoda Mosrentgen, is a settlement in Mosrentgen Settlement, Novomoskovsky Administrative Okrug of the federal city of Moscow, Russia. Population:

References

Rural localities in Moscow (federal city)
Novomoskovsky Administrative Okrug